Romance of the Wasteland, originally known as Hidden Law, is a 1924 American silent film starring Art Mix and Alma Rayford. It premiered on October 10, 1924.

Cast list
Art Mix as Ned Davis
Alma Rayford as Virginia Fairfield

References

American silent films
American black-and-white films
1920s American films